Vanderlei Bernardo Oliveira, or Vandinho is a centre forward and attacking midfielder who as of 2010 played for Ceará, and signed a preliminary contract to defend the Northwest in 2011.

Career
Oliveira began playing in Vasco and played for other teams such as Union Bandeirantes (SP), Mogi Mirim (SP), Paraná, São Paulo, Ponte Preta, Vila Nova and Northwest.

Contract
 Ceará.

References

External links
zerozerofootball.com

1980 births
Brazilian footballers
Living people
Ceará Sporting Club players
Association football forwards